Marina Gennadievna Verenikina (born 3 October 1982), known as Marina V, is a Russian singer and musician. She has released 12 albums and toured internationally, performing over 1,200 concerts.

Early life and education
Verenikina was born to a nuclear physicist father and child psychologist mother in Moscow, Russia. Her father Gennadiy Verenikin is of Russian descent and her mother Irina is half Jewish (her family came from Belarus in the 1870s). Marina started singing before she could talk, and writing songs at 4 years of age. 

Her mother arranged for formal music education, and Marina attended classical music school every day after her regular school day, from age 6 until age 14. She graduated summa cum laude. When she was 10 years old, Marina performed one of her original compositions for her piano teacher, who dismissed it as "nonsense".  Marina was discouraged and stopped writing for a while. 

At the time, the Soviet Union was falling apart and Western culture slowly started appearing on the market; therefore the only music Marina was exposed to as a child was classical and Russian folk songs. After a friend gave Marina a bootleg cassette of The Beatles, she was inspired to write songs again. She learned many Beatles songs, which also helped her improve her understanding of the English language.

At 15, Marina won a national competition, beating over 100,000 peers, for a fully funded scholarship (Future Leaders Exchange (FLEX)) to study in the United States. After living in Springfield, Illinois, for a year, she returned to Moscow and started working to save enough money to return to the US, where she felt a greater freedom for individual creativity. At the same time, Marina learned that her parents were divorcing and her mother was moving to Australia, and that the Russian school system would give her no credit for her time studying in America. 

Marina returned to Springfield when she was 17 years old, having saved money for a plane ticket, and she enrolled at Illinois College. During this time she battled with severe depression, and began to write more songs about her experiences and relationships, channeling her emotions into music. While at Illinois College she was also involved in the Concert Choir, International Club, and Investment Club. She graduated cum laude with a combined degree in international studies and economics-business and a minor in Spanish.

Career 

Shortly after she turned 19, Marina met guitarist Nick Baker, who inspired her to take her musical talents seriously. She sold her pickup truck and bought a piano. She entered in her college's talent competition and sang her original composition "Leaving," winning first prize. She then decided to start recording her music and was able to finance a recording session for her debut CD Let Me Dream through, paid for by pre-orders from students and faculty members. Her first show, at a coffeehouse in Jacksonville, Illinois, was filled to capacity. Marina and Baker began writing songs together and began touring around Illinois, enjoying considerable success. 

Marina and Baker moved to Los Angeles in 2001, the week after she graduated from Illinois College. Virtually unknown in Los Angeles, Marina and Baker accepted any gigs they could find — including a successful tour of several Borders Bookstores — and sent out hundreds of demos to people in the music industry. Eventually they caught the attention of David Krebs, a manager who had worked with Don McLean, Trans-Siberian Orchestra, AC/DC and Aerosmith, among others. 

In 2005, Marina joined forces with Jack Douglas. Douglas produced two tracks for her Simple Magic album: "Underneath Your Sky" and "Killing My Dream."

In Sept 2006, Marina released her first live album, "Live at SoundMoves," which was recorded in one session at SoundMoves recording studios in Burbank, California. In 2006, Marina and Nick Baker toured the Czech Republic and Slovakia.

In January 2008, Marina released "Modern Fairytale," recorded with Nick Baker, Marina's band, and their friend and engineer Jared Brown at the home studio of musician Graham Nash.

In 2009, "Sunshine Guaranteed" from "Modern Fairytale" was featured on a popular iPhone game, Tap Tap Revenge2. Another song, "Pesnya o Tebe", appears in Direct Contact, a 2009 Danny Lerner film starring Dolph Lundgren.

In January 2011, Marina and Baker released My Star, produced by Guy Erez. It was funded entirely by Marina's listeners, who raised $30,000 for her on marinav.com. One of the songs, "Killing My Dream," featured guitarist and former KISS member Bruce Kulick.

In 2011, several of Marina's songs aired on NBC's soap opera, Days of Our Lives. In July 2011, Marina released an EP entitled "Small Collection of Interesting Songs," which featured three of the songs featured on the program.

Marina and Baker wrote the theme song for the 2012 film Truth About Kerry.

The crowd funded "Inner Superhero" album, featuring the song "Hello" with a video filmed in her native Moscow, won the 2013 Entrepreneurs On The Move award. The album was unofficially released in 2013. In September 2013 Marina's song "Begu" was featured in a Lifetime TV Movie "Taken: The Search for Sophie Parker"

In October 2014 Marina appeared at The Grammy Museum In March 2015 Marina released her first Tour Documentary, "Enjoy The Ride," filmed during her 2014 U.S. Summer Tour, C Minor To Shining Sea.

In 2017 Marina released her next fan-sponsored album, Born To The Stars. The official music video featured cameos from Steel Panther, David Ellefson of Megadeth, Thomas Ian Nicholas of American Pie and Jill Sobule, among many others.

In December 2018 Marina traveled to Moscow with the Grammy Museum team to open the first ever Grammy Museum exhibit in Russia.

Personal life 
She became an American citizen in 2006.

She currently lives in Los Angeles with her husband and their daughter, Violetta, and regularly performs on Twitch.

Awards
 Hollywood Music Awards [nominated] (2009) for "You Make Me Beautiful"
YouBloom International Songwriting Award (2010) for "You Make Me Beautiful"; Judges included Sir Bob Geldof who gave Marina her trophy at the Awards Ceremony in London in February 2011
Entrepreneurs On The Move Award (2013) for "Inner Superhero"
 Hollywood International Entertainment Award (2014), which recognizes artistic achievement & outstanding careers.
 Hollywood Music in Media Award (2019) for duet rendition of Pat Benatar's "We Belong" with Dan Navarro

Discography

Albums
Let Me Dream (1999)
Lift (2001)
Something of My Own (2003)
Simple Magic (2005)
Marina V: Live at SoundMoves (2006)
Russian Bootleg (2007)
Modern Fairytale (2008)
My Star (2011)
Russian Bootleg Vol. 2 (2016)
Inner Superhero (2017)
Born to the Stars (2017)
In V Minor (2020)

EP
Small Collection of Interesting Songs (2011)

DVD
Enjoy the Ride: A Tour Documentary (2015)

References

External links

 Marina V brings gift, Tim Cain, Herald & Review, December 22, 2005
 Our Russian-born songbird takes flight Illinois Times (online) by Tom Irwin, December 21, 2006
 Marina V. Simple Magic Album review by Raine Alexandrea, Innocent Word (magazine), February/March 2006, Issue #18
 Interview,"Cut N' Dry Talent Radio" July 13, 2009
 Hollywood Music in Media Awards March 2010 Hollywood music in Media nomination

Living people
English-language singers from Russia
Illinois College alumni
Singers from Moscow
Russian emigrants to the United States
Russian pianists
Russian women pianists
Russian pop singers
Russian singer-songwriters
Russian women singer-songwriters
21st-century Russian singers
21st-century Russian women singers
21st-century pianists
1995 births
21st-century women pianists